is a Japanese romantic comedy anime television series produced by Doga Kobo. It aired from April 5 to June 28, 2018. The series is licensed in North America by Sentai Filmworks.

Plot
The story follows Mitsuyoshi Tada, a boy who has never known love. He is taking pictures of the cherry blossoms in full bloom when he meets Teresa Wagner, a transfer student from Luxembourg, a European country. It seems that she separated from her travel companion upon arriving in Japan. Tada helps her and brings her to his grandfather's coffee shop. Teresa's travel companion and bodyguard Alec arrives and beats up Kaoru misunderstanding him as chasing after Teresa. They discover that the hotel they're supposed to be staying in is actually next to Tada's cafe. The next day, they enroll in Tada's school and are in the same class. Alec agrees on joining the Photography Club on Teresa's request that she also wants to take great pictures. Mitsuyoshi is actually an aspiring photographer and wants to become like his father, who was a famous photographer. Mitsuyoshi lost his parents in a car accident during their childhood. The one last photo his father took and the camera were the only things that came back. The story focuses on the adventures of Tada and his friends and their building relationships.

Characters

The main character of this work. A second-year student at Koinosei High School attached to Ginga University. He belongs to the photography department. He lost his parents 10 years ago in an accident, and lives with his grandfather's Tada Coffee Shop while helping with his sister Yui. He aims to be the same photographer as his deceased father. He is loved by others because he is quiet but sincere and can be attentive to others. Good at landscape photography. Not good at high places and airplanes. He uses a Nikon D7200.
 / 

 The Princess of Luxemburg and the heir to the Queen's throne, she came overseas to Japan as an exchange student and has an encounter with Mitsuyoshi while traveling and ends up in his school. She's an avid fan of the fictional TV series Rainbow Shogun. She's an energetic but also an airheaded girl. She lives in Grand Palace Ginza, a hotel next to Mitsuyoshi's Cafe with her bodyguard Alec. No one knows about her being the heir to the Queen's throne in Japan. During her introduction to the Tada family, she slipped a syllable uttering her name as "Teresa du-" before correcting herself and saying "Teresa Wagner". For a member of the royal family, she's realistic in her expectations and does not show any arrogance. She has a heartwarming smile as shown in anime. She has blonde hair and green eyes.

Alexandra, or Alec, is Teresa's caretaker, assistant, and bodyguard who also attends school along with Teresa and has been in contact with her since childhood. She's fiercely protective of Teresa regarding the activities she does and the people she interacts with. Although, she has a weakness when Teresa asks her for something. She is constantly at war with Kaoru for his flirtatious ways of interacting with Teresa. She has red hair. Throughout the series, it is slowly revealed that she has hidden away feelings for Charles out of respect for Teresa.

Mitsuyoshi's close friend, classmate and fellow Photography Club member. He's a popular boy amongst girls and a narcissist who cannot resist the urge of photographing himself and showing off with girls. He has a fear of Alec after she beats him believing that he was chasing after Teresa. His family owns an old Japanese-style restaurant, which has allowed him to hone his cooking skill to the point where he is able to cook an entire feast for his friends.

The President of the Photography Club, he has a personal liking towards girls and desires to photograph them in the nude beyond anything else. He seems to be close with Hinako as the two know each other and also bicker frequently. He's a deep admirer of gravure idol Hina, and has a vast collection of her merchandise, but is unaware that Hina is actually Hinako. He is shown to be a pervert. He is called Pin-senpai by the club members.

The Class President of Mitsuyoshi's class, she is also a member of the Photography Club although she's mostly a stand-in so the club is not closed down. She seems close to Hajime as she addresses him casually although the two bicker frequently. She's a diligent girl but is secretly the gravure idol Hina, whom Hajime deeply admires, a fact he's oblivious to. Her identity as Hina is known only to Alec and Teresa, while Charles also seems to be suspiciously thinking the same as well.

A first year in Mitsuyoshi's school, he's nicknamed Yamashita Dog because he always responds to Mitsuyoshi's finger-whistling. He also behaves very much like a dog. He likes the neighbourhood beauty salon owner, though she only sees him as a little brother.

Mitsuyoshi's younger sister who attends their family Cafe. She has a crush on Yamashita.

A handsome young man with blonde hair. He is a descendant of French nobility. He has been in contact with Teresa since they were children. In Episode 6, he is revealed to be Teresa's fiancé, a fact unknown to everyone except Teresa, Alec and Charles himself. He is introduced to the Photography Club members as Teresa's childhood friend and gets in good terms with everyone by hitting right at their sweet spots. He is destined to become King of Luxemburg by marrying Teresa. Presently, he is a university student and also manages certain companies. During a discussion with Mitsuyoshi and Kaoru, he admits to have fallen in love once while gazing at Teresa.

A stray cat Mitsuyoshi found and adopted 10 years ago in the current storyline. He is proud of Mitsuyoshi as he has looked over him growing up and striving towards his dream to be a photographer. He has a great dislike for Kaoru. He has his own blog where Mitsuyoshi posts photos writes about his daily encounters with Kaoru. In Episode 3, he is smitten by Cherry, the neighbourhood beauty salon cat.

Production and development
The 13-episode original anime television series by Doga Kobo aired from April 5 to June 28, 2018. The series is directed by Mitsue Yamazaki, with series composition by Yoshiko Nakamura, character designs by Junichiro Taniguchi and music by Yukari Hashimoto. The opening theme is  performed by Masayoshi Ōishi, and the ending theme is a cover of the Sambomaster song  performed by Manaka Iwami as her character Teresa Wagner. Sentai Filmworks has licensed the series and streamed it on Hidive.

Episodes

Other media
A novel adaptation titled  was published by Kadokawa under their Kadokawa Beans Bunko imprint on June 1, 2018.

Notes

References

External links
 

Anime with original screenplays
Doga Kobo
Fiction about interracial romance
Muse Communication
Romantic comedy anime and manga
Sentai Filmworks